Sinclairsholm Castle is a castle in Hässleholm Municipality, Scania, in southern Sweden. It was built by the Danish privy counsellor Andrew Sinclair.

History 
The estate was founded in the beginning of the 17th century by the county governor at Landskrona Castle, the Danish privy counsellor Andrew Sinclair. In 1620 he made an exchanged for the parsonage which became the site for the construction of the house, which according to the inscription above the door was completed in 1626. Anders Sinclair, however, never saw the house complete as he died in 1625 and his son Kristian Sinclair took over. The estate then came to belong to Jochum Beck at Torup (probably through purchase), Jörgen Marsvin, county governor Håkan Nilsson Skytte, within whose family it remained until 1808. It has since been owned by the Gyllenkrook family. Via Baroness Eva Barnekow, born Gyllenkrook, the estate came to the Barnekow family, and is today owned by Baron Johan Barnekow.

Carl Linnaeus visited the castle between May 17-19 during his Scania trip in 1749. The owner was then Major Carl Henrik Skytte.

References

External links 

 Official website

See also
List of castles in Sweden

Castles in Skåne County